The **** of the Mothers is an out-of-print compilation album of early works by The Mothers of Invention, an American rock band. The album features a gatefold featuring some of the contemporary band members such as Ian Underwood, Art Tripp, and Motorhead Sherwood. This was the first of numerous repackaged "Best Of" LPs put out by MGM that were not authorized by Frank Zappa; Mothermania is the only one that Zappa worked on and approved.

Track listing

Credits
Frank Zappa – guitar, conductor, vocals
Jimmy Carl Black – percussion, drums, vocals
Ray Collins – harmonica, cymbals, sound effects, tambourine, vocals, finger cymbals
Elliot Ingber – alternate lead & rhythm guitar
Roy Estrada – bass, vocals, guitarron, soprano vocals
Gene Estes – percussion
Eugene Di Novi – piano
Neil Le Vang – guitar
John Rotella – clarinet, sax
Kurt Reher – cello
Raymond Kelley – cello
Paul Bergstrom – cello
Emmet Sargeant – cello
Joseph Saxon – cello
Edwin V. Beach – cello
Arthur Maebe – French horn, tuba
George Price – French horn
John Johnson – tuba
Carol Kaye – 12-string guitar
Virgil Evans – trumpet
David Wells – trombone
Kenneth Watson – percussion
Plas Johnson – sax, flute
Roy Caton – copyist
Carl Franzoni – freak
Vito – freak
Kim Fowley – (featured on hypophone)
Benjamin Barrett – contractor
David Anderle
Motorhead Sherwood – noises
Mac Rebennack – piano
Paul Butterfield
Les McCann – piano

Production
Producer: Tom Wilson
Arranged & Conducted: Frank Zappa
Art Direction: Sid Maurer
Cover Art: Abe Gurvin

References

External links
 http://www.collectable-records.ru/groups/zappa/mothers.htm

1968 greatest hits albums
Albums arranged by Frank Zappa
Albums conducted by Frank Zappa
Frank Zappa compilation albums
MGM Records compilation albums
Verve Records compilation albums